The Government of Portugal, also referred to as the Government of the Portuguese Republic, the Portuguese Government or simply the Government, is one of the four  of the Portuguese Republic, together with the President of the Republic, the Assembly of the Republic and the courts. It is both the body of sovereignty that conducts the general politics of the country and the superior body of the Portuguese public administration.

The term "constitutional government" or simply "government" also refers to the team of ministers and its period of management under one prime minister. This concept is similar to an "administration" in the parlance of a presidential republic or to a "collective ministry" in the parlance of some Commonwealth countries. Each government in this sense is identified by a roman number, with the present one (formed in March 2022) being the XXIII Constitutional Government of Portugal since the establishment of the current democratic regime, in 1976.

Composition
The Government comprises the prime minister, ministers and secretaries of state (junior ministers). Governments may also include one or more deputy prime ministers and deputy secretaries of state. Each minister usually heads a ministry and has assigned to him or her one or more secretaries of state, while certain governments may also assign one or more deputy ministers, as well.

Formation
After the elections for the Assembly of the Republic or the resignation of the previous government, the president listens to the parties in the Assembly of the Republic and invites someone to form a government.

The prime minister chooses the persons that he or she finds fit. Then the president swears in the prime minister and the Government.

Functions
The Government has political, legislative and administrative functions. These include, among other things, the power to negotiate with other countries or international organizations, to submit bills to the Assembly of the Republic, to issue decrees and to take administrative choices.

The Government guides its actions by the governmental program and implements it in the state budget that is submitted to the Assembly of the Republic each year, in the laws that it proposes, in the decrees that it issues in the Portuguese Council of Ministers, and in individual decisions made by its members.

There are no guarantees that the government will stick to its government program, but if it fails to do so, its actions will be judged by the citizens in forthcoming elections.

The Government may also be questioned by the other three sovereignty organs: the president of the republic, the Assembly of the Republic and the courts. The president may veto governmental decrees and a government bill may fail to pass in the Assembly of the Republic, where a motion of no confidence may be approved.

The Council of Ministers

The Council of Ministers is a collegial executive body within the Government of Portugal. It is usually presided over by the prime minister, but the president of the republic can preside over it at the prime minister's request. Besides the prime minister, the vice prime ministers and all ministers are members of the Council of Ministers. When the prime minister finds it fit, certain secretaries of state can also attend its meetings, but without being able to vote.

List of governments (since 1976)

See also
Cabinet (government)
Ministry (collective executive)
Politics of Portugal

Notes

References

External links

 
European governments